Swinhope is a village and civil parish about 6 miles west south west of North Thoresby railway station, in the West Lindsey district, in the county of Lincolnshire, England. In 2011 the parish had a population of 172. The parish touches Wold Newton, Thorganby, Brookenby, Binbrook and Stainton Le Vale. Swinhope doesn't have a formal parish council and instead holds parish meetings. In 2011 Nomis recorded a population of 194 which includes Thorganby parish. Swinhope was a deserted medieval village. The remains were completely destroyed in 1969 but crop marks remain within the village grounds.

Features 
There are 4 listed buildings in Swinhope.

History 
Swinhope was recorded in the Domesday Book as Suinhope. The name "Swinhope" means 'Swine valley'. Swinyhope is an alternative name for Swinhope as recorded in 1887.

The Alington family were the main landowners here for centuries. The best-known member of the family was Marmaduke Alington MP (1671-1749).

References

External links 

Villages in Lincolnshire
Civil parishes in Lincolnshire
West Lindsey District